Martina Navratilova and Gabriela Sabatini were the defending champions but did not compete that year.

Jana Novotná and Catherine Suire won in the final 6–3, 4–6, 7–5 against Jenny Byrne and Janine Tremelling.

Seeds
Champion seeds are indicated in bold text while text in italics indicates the round in which those seeds were eliminated. The top four seeded teams received byes into the second round.

Draw

Final

Top half

Bottom half

References

External links
 1988 Italian Open Women's Doubles draw

1988 WTA Tour
Women's Doubles
1988 in Italian women's sport